Fritz Walter (born 21 July 1960) is a German former professional footballer who played as a striker, and who was nicknamed "Little Fritz". Born in Mannheim, he is of no relation to German legend of the same name Fritz Walter.

With 22 goals in the 1991–92 Bundesliga season, Fritz Walter was crowned the league's top scorer when he won the German Championship with VfB Stuttgart.

Career statistics

Honours
VfB Stuttgart
 UEFA Cup runner-up: 1988–89
 Bundesliga: 1991–92
 DFL-Supercup: 1992

Germany
 Olympic bronze medal: 1988

Individual
 Bundesliga top scorer: 1991–92

References

External links
 

1960 births
Living people
Footballers from Mannheim
German footballers
SSV Ulm 1846 players
VfB Stuttgart players
Arminia Bielefeld players
SV Waldhof Mannheim players
Bundesliga players
2. Bundesliga players
Regionalliga players
Association football forwards
Kicker-Torjägerkanone Award winners
Olympic footballers of West Germany
West German footballers
Footballers at the 1988 Summer Olympics
Olympic bronze medalists for West Germany
Olympic medalists in football
Medalists at the 1988 Summer Olympics